

122001–122100 

|-bgcolor=#f2f2f2
| colspan=4 align=center | 
|}

122101–122200 

|-bgcolor=#f2f2f2
| colspan=4 align=center | 
|}

122201–122300 

|-bgcolor=#f2f2f2
| colspan=4 align=center | 
|}

122301–122400 

|-bgcolor=#f2f2f2
| colspan=4 align=center | 
|}

122401–122500 

|-bgcolor=#f2f2f2
| colspan=4 align=center | 
|}

122501–122600 

|-id=554
| 122554 Joséhernández ||  || José M. Hernández (born 1962) was born into a migrant farming family. He became an American astronaut and was a mission specialist on the Space Shuttle Discovery to the International Space Station in 2008. Prior to his time as an astronaut, Hernández helped to develop the first full-field digital mammography imaging system. || 
|-id=555
| 122555 Auñón-Chancellor ||  || Serena Auñón-Chancellor (born 1976) is an engineer, physician, and astronaut. She has collected meteorites in Antarctica, served as an aquanaut on an undersea research station, and was a Flight Engineer on the International Space Station for 6 months in 2018. || 
|}

122601–122700 

|-id=632
| 122632 Riccioli ||  || Giovanni Riccioli (1598–1671) was one of the first telescopic observers of the Moon. He was author of the Almagestum Novum, that contains a lunar map still used today. || 
|}

122701–122800 

|-bgcolor=#f2f2f2
| colspan=4 align=center | 
|}

122801–122900 

|-bgcolor=#f2f2f2
| colspan=4 align=center | 
|}

122901–123000 

|-bgcolor=#f2f2f2
| colspan=4 align=center | 
|}

References 

122001-123000